Owch Bolagh (also Romanized as Owch Bolāgh and Ūch Bolāgh) is a village in Sanjabad-e Gharbi Rural District, in the Central District of Kowsar County, Ardabil Province, Iran. At the 2006 census, its population was 39, in 6 families.

References 

Towns and villages in Kowsar County